Ross Howard Street (born 29 September 1945, Sydney) is an Australian mathematician specialising in category theory.

Biography
Street completed his undergraduate and postgraduate study at the University of Sydney, where his dissertation advisor was Max Kelly. He is an emeritus professor of mathematics at Macquarie University, a fellow of the Australian Mathematical Society (1995), and was elected Fellow of the Australian Academy of Science in 1989.  He was awarded the Edgeworth David Medal of the Royal Society of New South Wales in 1977, and the Australian Mathematical Society's George Szekeres Medal in 2012.

References

External links 
Personal webpage, maths.mq.edu.au
 

Living people
Australian mathematicians
Category theorists
Academic staff of Macquarie University
Fellows of the Australian Academy of Science
Recipients of the Centenary Medal
1945 births